Ms. Monopoly is a version of Monopoly that recognizes women inventors and gives bonuses to feminine players. It was released by Hasbro in 2019.

Gameplay
This is a variation of the game Monopoly, so only differences from standard gameplay will be listed. 

Money bonuses are provided to feminine players in Ms. Monopoly. Women get $1,900 at the start of the game and receive $240 salary when passing “Go,” whereas men start with $1,500 and receive a $200 salary.

In addition, the game differs from regular Monopoly in that properties are replaced by inventions women created or contributed to, including Wi-Fi, to which Hedy Lamarr and Radia Perlman contributed; modern shapewear by Spanx founder Sara Blakely; and chocolate chip cookies, invented by Ruth Graves Wakefield. Tokens have been replaced with new ones: a notebook and pen, a jet, a glass, a watch, a barbell, and Ms. Monopoly's white hat. Chance and Community Chest cards also provide different payouts between genders, sometimes higher for either men or women. Jail and luxury taxes are maintained from the regular game.

The game replaces Rich Uncle Pennybags, the mascot on most Monopoly versions, with a young woman described as his niece. As part of the game's rollout, Hasbro sent three teenage girls a grant of $20,580 each to invest in their own inventions. Hasbro promoted Ms. Monopoly as the first game "where women make more than men". In a statement, Hasbro said that the game provides an environment in which "women have an advantage often enjoyed by men".

Reception
Reception towards Ms. Monopoly was extremely negative upon its announcement. Eric Thurm, the author of "Avidly Reads: Board Games", said the game created a "surface-level fantasy world" where women succeed simply because of their gender. Madeleine Kearns of National Review called it "patronizing pointlessness". Queens College's philosophy department head Christine Sypnowich said it was "unhelpful to portray women as needing special advantages." Jennifer Borda, an associate professor specializing in feminist studies at the University of New Hampshire, suggested that it would be more suitable if male players instead faced challenges women face in the workplace. Mary Pilon, author of The Monopolists, criticized the game for failing to recognize Lizzie Magie, who invented The Landlord's Game, the precursor to Monopoly.

References

External links
 

Monopoly (game)
Feminist mass media
Board games introduced in 2019